Anusmriti Sarkar was an Indian actress. She is known for her Telugu movies Ishta Sakhi and Heroine. And recently she is known for her debut Hindi movie One Day Justice Delivered and O Pushpa I hate tears.

Career 
Anusmriti made her acting debut with the Bengali film Bhorer Alo, replacing Riya Sen to star opposite Rohit Roy. This film was directed by two time National Award-winning director Prabhat Roy.

Her next project, in the same year, was Tollywood film Vankai Fry. The film was directed by Chandra Mauli, and she starred opposite a newcomer actor.

Post that, she immediately signed her second Bengali film Bikram Singha: The Lion Is Back, directed by Rajiv Kumar Biswas, where she starred opposite Bengali superstar Prosenjit Chatterjee. This led to her signing Telugu film Ishta Sakhi, where she starred with famous actor Srihari and two other heroes. Her acting was very much appreciated in Ishta Sakhi.

She also worked on Telugu film Suswagatam where she played the main lead opposite famous Telugu actor Raja, and two more Bengali films: Biporjoy starred with Indronil Sengupta and one more Bengali movie call  Moner Majhi Tumi.

Sarkar then bagged Telugu film Heroine, directed by Bharath Parapelli where she played the lead role and was widely appreciated for her acting.

Throughout the early phase of her career, Anusmriti Sarkar did a series of films in both Bengali and Telugu industry. Recently Anusmriti's next Bollywood movie got released called "Oo Pushpa I hate tears" with Krushna Abhishek and Jayraam Karthik.

Other work 
Anusmriti has done many ad campaigns like Khadims, BSNL, Tiger biscuit, Reliance SIM card, Marie Biscuit, Manyavar, Chirag Computer, Livon hair serum and many more. Anusmriti also contributes in campaigns which supports a cause to maintain a healthy environment.

Filmography

References

External links
 

Living people
Indian film actresses
Actresses from Kolkata
Year of birth missing (living people)